Trafalgar School for Girls (abbreviated as Traf) is an all-girls independent school located in Downtown Montreal, Quebec. The school serves students at Secondary I – V levels, i.e. ages 11–12 to 16–17. The total enrollment is 200, the student-teacher ratio is 8:1, and the average class size is a range from 10 to 20.

Background
The site is within the Golden Square Mile, which was the richest neighbourhood in Canada when the school opened in 1887. The idea came from a wealthy merchant named Donald Ross. The institute received funds from Anne Scott and Donald Smith, 1st Baron Strathcona and Mount Royal, as well as other prominent residents of Montreal. The school's curriculum was designed to prepare girls for higher education, although only a small minority actually went to university.

The Montreal Hoshuko School, a weekend Japanese school, rents classroom space there.

Notable former pupils
 Nora Collyer, painter
 Caryl Churchill, playwright
 Jessalyn Gilsig, actress 
 Vivien Law, linguist and academic
 Cairine Wilson, politician
 Rhona and Rhoda Wurtele, Olympic skiers

References

External links

 Trafalgar School for Girls

Educational institutions established in 1887
1887 establishments in Quebec
Private schools in Quebec
Girls' schools in Canada
High schools in Montreal
Downtown Montreal
English-language schools in Quebec